Espenschied Nunatak is the westernmost member of the Snow Nunataks, on the English Coast of Ellsworth Land, Antarctica. This nunatak was mapped by the United States Geological Survey from surveys and U.S. Navy air photos, 1961–66, and was named by the Advisory Committee on Antarctic Names after Peter C. Espenschied, a United States Antarctic Research Program auroral scientist at the Byrd Auroral Sub-Station, 1960–61.

References 

Nunataks of Ellsworth Land